Badengan-e Sofla (also Romanized as Bādengān-e Soflá; also known as Bādangūn-e Pā’īn, Bādengān-e Pā’īn, and Bādengūn Soflá) is a village in Pataveh Rural District, Pataveh District, Dana County, Kohgiluyeh and Boyer-Ahmad Province, Iran. At the 2006 census, its population was 235, in 47 families.

References 

Populated places in Dana County